was a Japanese photographer.

Publications
 Kenzō Tange and Noboru Kawazoe. Ise. Prototype of Japanese Architecture. Photographs by Yoshio Watanabe. Cambridge, Massachusetts: The M.I.T. Press, 1965.
 Sutemi Horiguchi and Yoshio Watanabe. Ise jingū. [Tōkyō]: Heibonsha, 1973.
 Yoshio Watanabe. Ise jingū. Tōkyō: Nikkōrukurabu, 1994.

References

External links
 Yoshio Watanabe, photographs, Canadian Centre for Architecture
 

Japanese photographers
1907 births
2000 deaths
Recipients of the Medal with Purple Ribbon